Bite Me may refer to:

 Bite Me! (film), a 2004 horror film
 Bite Me (2019 film), an American romantic comedy film
 "Bite Me" (CSI), a sixth-season episode of the television series CSI: Crime Scene Investigation
 "Bite Me" (Charmed), a fourth-season episode of the television series Charmed
 "Bite Me" (song), a song by Avril Lavigne from her 2022 album Love Sux
 "Bite Me", a sixth-season episode of the television series Medium
 "Bite Me", a song by "Weird Al" Yankovic from his 1992 album Off the Deep End
 "Bite Me", a song by Electric Six from their 2005 album Señor Smoke
 "Bite Me!", a song by Hocico from their 2010 album Tiempos de Furia 
 Bite Me, a 2016 comedy show written by Joanne McNally
 Bite Me, a web series produced by Machinima

See also
 Bite Me: A Love Story, a 2010 novel by Christopher Moore
 Bite Me: Narrative Structures and Buffy the Vampire Slayer, a 2003 Australian publication relating to the "Buffyverse"
 Bite Me! Chameleon, the English title of the Japanese manga Chameleon